Arsenic (33As) has 33 known isotopes and at least 10 isomers. Only one of these isotopes, 75As, is stable; as such, it is considered a monoisotopic element. The longest-lived radioisotope is 73As with a half-life of 80 days. Arsenic has been proposed as a "salting" material for nuclear weapons (cobalt is another, better-known salting material). A jacket of 75As, irradiated by the intense high-energy neutron flux from an exploding thermonuclear weapon, would transmute into the radioactive isotope 76As with a half-life of 1.0778 days and produce approximately 1.13 MeV gamma radiation, significantly increasing the radioactivity of the weapon's fallout for several hours. Such a weapon is not known to have ever been built, tested, or used.

List of isotopes 

|-
| 60As
| style="text-align:right" | 33
| style="text-align:right" | 27
| 59.99313(64)#
|
| p
| 59Ge
| 5+#
|
|
|-
| 61As
| style="text-align:right" | 33
| style="text-align:right" | 28
| 60.98062(64)#
|
| p
| 60Ge
| 3/2−#
|
|
|-
| 62As
| style="text-align:right" | 33
| style="text-align:right" | 29
| 61.97320(32)#
|
| p
| 61Ge
| 1+#
|
|
|-
| 63As
| style="text-align:right" | 33
| style="text-align:right" | 30
| 62.96369(54)#
|
| p
| 62Ge
| (3/2−)#
|
|
|-
| 64As
| style="text-align:right" | 33
| style="text-align:right" | 31
| 63.95757(38)#
| 40(30) ms[18(+43-7) ms]
| β+
| 64Ge
| 0+#
|
|
|-
| 65As
| style="text-align:right" | 33
| style="text-align:right" | 32
| 64.94956(32)#
| 170(30) ms
| β+
| 65Ge
| 3/2−#
|
|
|-
| 66As
| style="text-align:right" | 33
| style="text-align:right" | 33
| 65.94471(73)
| 95.77(23) ms
| β+
| 66Ge
| (0+)
|
|
|-
| style="text-indent:1em" | 66m1As
| colspan="3" style="text-indent:2em" | 1356.70(17) keV
| 1.1(1) µs
|
|
| (5+)
|
|
|-
| style="text-indent:1em" | 66m2As
| colspan="3" style="text-indent:2em" | 3023.9(3) keV
| 8.2(5) µs
|
|
| (9+)
|
|
|-
| 67As
| style="text-align:right" | 33
| style="text-align:right" | 34
| 66.93919(11)
| 42.5(12) s
| β+
| 67Ge
| (5/2−)
|
|
|-
| 68As
| style="text-align:right" | 33
| style="text-align:right" | 35
| 67.93677(5)
| 151.6(8) s
| β+
| 68Ge
| 3+
|
|
|-
| style="text-indent:1em" | 68mAs
| colspan="3" style="text-indent:2em" | 425.21(16) keV
| 111(20) ns[?107(+23-16) ns]
|
|
| 1+
|
|
|-
| 69As
| style="text-align:right" | 33
| style="text-align:right" | 36
| 68.93227(3)
| 15.2(2) min
| β+
| 69Ge
| 5/2−
|
|
|-
| 70As
| style="text-align:right" | 33
| style="text-align:right" | 37
| 69.93092(5)
| 52.6(3) min
| β+
| 70Ge
| 4(+#)
|
|
|-
| style="text-indent:1em" | 70mAs
| colspan="3" style="text-indent:2em" | 32.008(23) keV
| 96(3) µs
|
|
| 2(+)
|
|
|-
| 71As
| style="text-align:right" | 33
| style="text-align:right" | 38
| 70.927112(5)
| 65.28(15) h
| β+
| 71Ge
| 5/2−
|
|
|-
| 72As
| style="text-align:right" | 33
| style="text-align:right" | 39
| 71.926752(5)
| 26.0(1) h
| β+
| 72Ge
| 2−
|
|
|-
| 73As
| style="text-align:right" | 33
| style="text-align:right" | 40
| 72.923825(4)
| 80.30(6) d
| EC
| 73Ge
| 3/2−
|
|
|-
| rowspan=2|74As
| rowspan=2 style="text-align:right" | 33
| rowspan=2 style="text-align:right" | 41
| rowspan=2|73.9239287(25)
| rowspan=2|17.77(2) d
| β+ (66%)
| 74Ge
| rowspan=2|2−
| rowspan=2|
| rowspan=2|
|-
| β− (34%)
| 74Se
|-
| 75As
| style="text-align:right" | 33
| style="text-align:right" | 42
| 74.9215965(20)
| colspan=3 align=center|Stable
| 3/2−
| 1.0000
|
|-
| style="text-indent:1em" | 75mAs
| colspan="3" style="text-indent:2em" | 303.9241(7) keV
| 17.62(23) ms
|
|
| 9/2+
|
|
|-
| rowspan=2|76As
| rowspan=2 style="text-align:right" | 33
| rowspan=2 style="text-align:right" | 43
| rowspan=2|75.922394(2)
| rowspan=2|1.0942(7) d
| β− (99.98%)
| 76Se
| rowspan=2|2−
| rowspan=2|
| rowspan=2|
|-
| EC (.02%)
| 76Ge
|-
| style="text-indent:1em" | 76mAs
| colspan="3" style="text-indent:2em" | 44.425(1) keV
| 1.84(6) µs
|
|
| (1)+
|
|
|-
| 77As
| style="text-align:right" | 33
| style="text-align:right" | 44
| 76.9206473(25)
| 38.83(5) h
| β−
| 77mSe
| 3/2−
|
|
|-
| style="text-indent:1em" | 77mAs
| colspan="3" style="text-indent:2em" | 475.443(16) keV
| 114.0(25) µs
|
|
| 9/2+
|
|
|-
| 78As
| style="text-align:right" | 33
| style="text-align:right" | 45
| 77.921827(11)
| 90.7(2) min
| β−
| 78Se
| 2−
|
|
|-
| 79As
| style="text-align:right" | 33
| style="text-align:right" | 46
| 78.920948(6)
| 9.01(15) min
| β−
| 79mSe
| 3/2−
|
|
|-
| style="text-indent:1em" | 79mAs
| colspan="3" style="text-indent:2em" | 772.81(6) keV
| 1.21(1) µs
|
|
| (9/2)+
|
|
|-
| 80As
| style="text-align:right" | 33
| style="text-align:right" | 47
| 79.922534(25)
| 15.2(2) s
| β−
| 80Se
| 1+
|
|
|-
| 81As
| style="text-align:right" | 33
| style="text-align:right" | 48
| 80.922132(6)
| 33.3(8) s
| β−
| 81mSe
| 3/2−
|
|
|-
| 82As
| style="text-align:right" | 33
| style="text-align:right" | 49
| 81.92450(21)
| 19.1(5) s
| β−
| 82Se
| (1+)
|
|
|-
| style="text-indent:1em" | 82mAs
| colspan="3" style="text-indent:2em" | 250(200) keV
| 13.6(4) s
| β−
| 82Se
| (5-)
|
|
|-
| 83As
| style="text-align:right" | 33
| style="text-align:right" | 50
| 82.92498(24)
| 13.4(3) s
| β−
| 83mSe
| 3/2−#
|
|
|-
| rowspan=2|84As
| rowspan=2 style="text-align:right" | 33
| rowspan=2 style="text-align:right" | 51
| rowspan=2|83.92906(32)#
| rowspan=2|4.02(3) s
| β− (99.721%)
| 84Se
| rowspan=2|(3)(+#)
| rowspan=2|
| rowspan=2|
|-
| β−, n (.279%)
| 83Se
|-
| style="text-indent:1em" | 84mAs
| colspan="3" style="text-indent:2em" | 0(100)# keV
| 650(150) ms
|
|
|
|
|
|-
| rowspan=2|85As
| rowspan=2 style="text-align:right" | 33
| rowspan=2 style="text-align:right" | 52
| rowspan=2|84.93202(21)#
| rowspan=2|2.021(10) s
| β−, n (59.4%)
| 84Se
| rowspan=2|(3/2−)#
| rowspan=2| 
| rowspan=2|
|-
| β− (40.6%)
| 85Se
|-
| rowspan=2|86As
| rowspan=2 style="text-align:right" | 33
| rowspan=2 style="text-align:right" | 53
| rowspan=2|85.93650(32)#
| rowspan=2|0.945(8) s
| β− (67%)
| 86Se
| rowspan=2|
| rowspan=2|
| rowspan=2|
|-
| β−, n (33%)
| 85Se
|-
| rowspan=2|87As
| rowspan=2 style="text-align:right" | 33
| rowspan=2 style="text-align:right" | 54
| rowspan=2|86.93990(32)#
| rowspan=2|0.56(8) s
| β− (84.6%)
| 87Se
| rowspan=2|3/2−#
| rowspan=2|
| rowspan=2|
|-
| β−, n (15.4%)
| 86Se
|-
| rowspan=2|88As
| rowspan=2 style="text-align:right" | 33
| rowspan=2 style="text-align:right" | 55
| rowspan=2|87.94494(54)#
| rowspan=2|300# ms[>300 ns]
| β−
| 88Se
| rowspan=2|
| rowspan=2|
| rowspan=2|
|-
| β−, n
| 87Se
|-
| 89As
| style="text-align:right" | 33
| style="text-align:right" | 56
| 88.94939(54)#
| 200# ms[>300 ns]
| β−
| 89Se
| 3/2−#
|
|
|-
| 90As
| style="text-align:right" | 33
| style="text-align:right" | 57
| 89.95550(86)#
| 80# ms[>300 ns]
|
|
|
|
|
|-
| 91As
| style="text-align:right" | 33
| style="text-align:right" | 58
| 90.96043(97)#
| 50# ms[>300 ns]
|
|
| 3/2−#
|
|
|-
| 92As
| style="text-align:right" | 33
| style="text-align:right" | 59
| 91.96680(97)#
| 30# ms[>300 ns]
|
|
|
|
|

References 

 Isotope masses from:

 Isotopic compositions and standard atomic masses from:

 Half-life, spin, and isomer data selected from the following sources.

 A.Shore, A. Fritsch, M. Heim, A. Schuh, M. Thoennessen. Discovery of the Arsenic Isotopes. arXiv:0902.4361.

External links

 
Arsenic
Arsenic